The 2021  PBA Tour season, the 62nd season of play for the U.S. Professional Bowlers Association's ten-pin bowling tour, began on January 14 with the Regional Portions of the PBA Players Championship. The season included 14 singles title events and two doubles title events.

The 2021 season has featured three televised perfect 300 games, the 30th, 31st and 32nd in PBA Tour history. The first was accomplished by Chris Via (February 7, PBA Players Championship East Region finals) and the second by Sam Cooley (May 16, PBA Tour Playoffs). Via then rolled his second 300 game of the season on June 27 at the PBA Tour Finals, joining Sean Rash and François Lavoie as the only players in history with two televised 300 games in PBA Tour title events.

This season has also seen the fourth-ever 7–10 split conversion in a televised PBA Tour event (and first since 1991), accomplished by 18-year old rookie Anthony Neuer in the semifinal match of the U.S. Open.

Kyle Troup has set the PBA's single-season earnings record this season, with $496,900. The previous record holder was Walter Ray Williams Jr., who earned $419,700 in the 2002–03 season.

Season overview
The PBA announced it would open the 2021 season with a revamped and expanded PBA Players Championship that opens up the event to a broader portion of the PBA membership. Five Regional events (West, Southwest, Central, South and East) were hosted first. After 28 qualifying games (7 games on each of four different oil patterns), each Region held its own stepladder finals broadcast on FS1. The five Regional winners then competed in the tournament finals held in Jupiter, Florida on February 21, which was broadcast live on Fox. The Regional concept was introduced, in part, due to travel restrictions that have resulted from the continuing COVID-19 pandemic, and will allow most PBA professionals to compete in safe events closer to home.  In addition, the 2021 PBA Players Championship featured a $1 million prize fund, with a PBA record-tying $250,000 first place prize.

The PBA Tournament of Champions took place February 23–28, also in Jupiter, Florida (following the conclusion of the PBA Players Championship finals in the same location). The PBA then moved to Tampa, Florida for World Series of Bowling (WSOB) XII. WSOB XII featured three animal oil pattern title events (Cheetah, Chameleon, Scorpion), with these three tournaments serving as initial qualifying for the PBA World Championship major. WSOB XII also included the PBA Roth-Holman Doubles Championship. The PBA World Championship finals aired on Saturday afternoon, March 13 on Fox, kicking off five consecutive days of broadcasts. The Roth-Holman Doubles, Cheetah Championship, Chameleon Championship and Scorpion Championship aired March 14–17 on FS1.

The U.S. Open was originally scheduled to take place in Green Bay, Wisconsin while the USBC Masters was to be held in Las Vegas, Nevada.  In December 2020, the USBC announced the two events would be held in back-to-back weeks (March 30 through April 11). Both tournaments were held in Reno, Nevada due to COVID-19 continuing to impact USBC operations.

Following the U.S. Open was the PBA Super Slam on April 18, which saw the five PBA major winners vying for a $100,000 first prize. The third annual PBA Tour Playoffs ran from April 24 through May 16. Previous events featured the top 24 players in points through the first 13 events of the season, but due to only nine events being scheduled before the 2021 Playoffs, this season's tournament started with the top 16 players only.

On April 29, the PBA announced the return of the King of the Lanes event, to be held this season on June 19 & 20 in Portland, Maine. The "last man standing" format will have reigning king Kris Prather returning, with a mix of veteran and current players looking to gain the throne over the five rounds. The challengers include: Chris Barnes, AJ Johnson, Jesper Svensson, Parker Bohn III, Chris Via, Anthony Neuer, Tim Mack, Jason Sterner, Tom Daugherty and François Lavoie. The PBA member event will be preceded by an all-women's event, the PBA King of the Lanes: Empress Edition, on June 15 & 16. (In the 2020 PBA King of the Lanes, two females – Clara Guerrero and Gazmine Mason – participated against an otherwise all-male field.) This marked the first PBA event to have a live audience since February 2020.

The PBA Tour Finals, featuring the top eight points earners since the start of the 2020 season, was held June 26–27 in Allen Park, Michigan, with all rounds airing live on CBS Sports Network.

In May, the PBA finalized scheduling for five Summer Tour events, beginning with the Lubbock Sports Open on July 23–25 and concluding with the Chesapeake Open on August 20–22. All events awarded a PBA title, Tier 3 Tour points and a minimum $10,000 winner's share, with a $40,000 bonus pool up for grabs based on combined points over the five stops. The top points earner (Darren Tang) won a $20,000 bonus, with smaller amounts awarded to the second through tenth place finishers.

Season awards
 Chris Schenkel PBA Player of the Year: Kyle Troup
 Harry Smith PBA Points Leader: Kyle Troup
 Harry Golden PBA Rookie of the Year: Matt Russo
 PBA Steve Nagy Sportsmanship Award: Jake Peters
 PBA Tony Reyes Community Service Award: Warren Eales

Tournament summary
The events for the 2021 PBA tournament schedule are shown below. Major tournaments are in bold. Career PBA title numbers for winners are shown in parenthesis (#). Winner's share prize money is shown in US dollars ($), except where indicated.

Tour points are awarded for most events. Besides the season-ending Harry Smith PBA Points Winner award, points are one consideration for Player of the Year voting, and also affect eligibility for the PBA Tour Playoffs and PBA Tour Finals (combined with 2020 points). Points for tournaments are awarded differently based on a "tier" system. The tier of each qualifying tournament is shown in the Notes column on the tournament schedule, and is explained below.

 Tier 3: PBA short format or limited field tournaments (2500 points for first, and descending thereafter)
 Tier 2: PBA standard tournaments with a fully open field (double the points of Tier 3 events)
 Tier 1: PBA major tournaments (triple the points of Tier 3 events)

References

External links
PBA 2021 Season Schedule

Professional Bowlers Association seasons
2021 in bowling